The William Green House is a historic brick farmhouse in Ewing Township of Mercer County, New Jersey, United States. It was added to the National Register of Historic Places on December 4, 1973, for its significance in agriculture and architecture.

History and description
The first home on the site was built in the last decade of the 17th century. According to a privately published family monograph, the farmhouse was the home of Judge William Green, who was born in the 1600s in England and died in 1722 in Hunterdon County, New Jersey. The house is owned by the College of New Jersey, but is in a poor state of repair. It has been considered an endangered historic site for over 40 years and, despite efforts taken by the college in 2006 to shore up the structure, was listed in 2015 as one of New Jersey's 10 most endangered historic sites by Preservation New Jersey.

See also
National Register of Historic Places listings in Mercer County, New Jersey
List of the oldest buildings in New Jersey

References

External links

National Register of Historic Places in Mercer County, New Jersey
Houses in Mercer County, New Jersey
Ewing Township, New Jersey
The College of New Jersey
New Jersey Register of Historic Places
Brick buildings and structures